The Port del Cantó, or Coll del Cantó or Coll de la Pedra del Cantó, is a mountain pass at an altitude of  located at the border of the municipalities of Soriguera, in the comarca of Pallars Sobirà, and Montferrer i Castellbò in the comarca of Alt Urgell in Catalonia, Spain.

The pass is located at kilometre 260 of the N-260 road.

Distance to the top of the  port is 28.8 km. Slope for emergency is 1073m, 4.3%. Western slope starts from sort and is 1038m,5.3%.

Tour de France
The route, from the western side, was used on Stage 9 of the 2016 Tour de France.

Appearances in the Tour de France

References

Cantó
Mountain passes of the Pyrenees
Alt Urgell
Pallars Sobirà